The Western Athletic Conference (WAC) is an NCAA Division I conference. The WAC covers a broad expanse of the western United States with member institutions located in Arizona, California, New Mexico, Utah, Washington, and Texas.

Due to most of the conference's football-playing members leaving the WAC for other affiliations, the conference discontinued football as a sponsored sport after the 2012–13 season and left the NCAA's Football Bowl Subdivision (formerly known as Division I-A). The WAC thus became the first Division I conference to drop football since the Big West in 2000. The WAC then added men's soccer and became one of the NCAA's eleven Division I non-football conferences. The WAC underwent a major expansion on July 1, 2021, with four schools joining. The conference reinstated football at that time and now competes in the Football Championship Subdivision. One year later, on July 1, 2022, one FCS football school (Lamar) and one non-football school (Chicago State) left, and one FCS football school (Southern Utah) and one non-football school (UT Arlington) joined.

Members

Current members
The following institutions are the current full members of the Western Athletic Conference as of July 2022. Departing members are highlighted in red.

Notes

Affiliate members
The following 9 schools field programs in the WAC for sports not sponsored by their primary conferences.

Future affiliate members
New Mexico State will remain a WAC member in women's swimming & diving after it departs for Conference USA, which dropped that sport after the 2021–22 season.

Notes

Former full members
The WAC has 30 former full members.

{| class="wikitable sortable" style="text-align: center"
|-
!Institution !! Nickname !! Location !! Founded !! Type !! Enrollment !! Joined !! Left !! Currentprimaryconference
|-
| (Air Force)
| Falcons
| Colorado Springs, Colorado
| 1954
| Federal
| 4,413
| 1980
| 1999
| Mountain West
|-
| 
| Wildcats
| Tucson, Arizona
| 1885
| Public
| 39,236
| 1962
| 1978
| Pac-12
|-
| Arizona State University
| Sun Devils
| Tempe, Arizona
| 1885
| Public
| 59,794
| 1962
| 1978
| Pac-12
|-
| Boise State University
| Broncos
| Boise, Idaho
| 1932
| Public
| 22,678
| 2001
| 2011
| Mountain West
|-
| Brigham Young University(BYU)
| Cougars
| Provo, Utah
| 1875
| Private
| 34,130
| 1962
| 1999
| WCCFBS Independent
|-
| California State University, Bakersfield
| Roadrunners
| Bakersfield, California
| 1965
| Public
| 10,500
| 2013
| 2020
| Big West
|-
| (Fresno State)
| Bulldogs
| Fresno, California
| 1911
| Public
| 22,565
| 1992
| 2012
| Mountain West
|-
| Chicago State University
| Cougars
| Chicago, Illinois
| 1867
| Public(TMCF)
| 
| 2013
| 2022
| Independent
|-
| Colorado State University
| Rams
| Fort Collins, Colorado
| 1870
| Public
| 28,417
| 1968 
| 1999
| Mountain West
|-
| 
| Pioneers
| Denver, Colorado
| 1864
| Private
| 11,476
| 2012
| 2013
| Summit
|-
| 
| Rainbow Warriors & Rainbow Wahine
| Honolulu, Hawaii
| 1907
| Public
| 20,435
| 1979
| 2012
| Big WestMountain West (football only)
|-
| 
| Vandals
| Moscow, Idaho
| 1889
| Public
| 12,312
| 2005
| 2014
| Big Sky
|- 
| (Kansas City)
| Roos
| Kansas City, Missouri
| 1933
| Public
| 16,944
| 2013
| 2020
| Summit
|-
| Lamar University
| Cardinals/ Lady Cardinals
| Beaumont, Texas
| 1923
| Public
| 16,191
| 2021
| 2022
| Southland
|-
| Louisiana Tech University
| Bulldogs (men's)Lady Techsters (women's)
| Ruston, Louisiana
| 1894
| Public
| 11,581
| 2001
| 2013
| C-USA
|-
| (UNLV)
| Rebels
| Paradise, Nevada
| 1957
| Public
| 28,203
| 1996
| 1999
| Mountain West
|-
| 
| Wolf Pack
| Reno, Nevada
| 1874
| Public
| 18,227
| 2000
| 2012
| Mountain West
|-
| 
| Lobos
| Albuquerque, New Mexico
| 1889
| Public
| 35,211
| 1962
| 1999
| Mountain West
|-
| Rice University
| Owls
| Houston, Texas
| 1912
| Private
| 6,082
| 1996
| 2005
| C-USA
|-
| San Diego State University
| Aztecs
| San Diego, California
| 1897
| Public
| 28,789
| 1978
| 1999
| Mountain West
|-
| San Jose State University
| Spartans
| San Jose, California
| 1857
| Public
| 30,448
| 1996
| 2013
| Mountain West
|-
| Southern Methodist University(SMU)
| Mustangs
| University Park, Texas
| 1911
| Private
| 12,000
| 1996
| 2005
| The American
|-
| Texas Christian University(TCU)
| Horned Frogs
| Fort Worth, Texas
| 1873
| Private
| 9,725
| 1996
| 2001
| Big 12
|-
| (UTEP)
| Miners
| El Paso, Texas
| 1914
| Public
| 21,011
| 1968 
| 2005
| C-USA
|-
| (UTSA)| Roadrunners
| San Antonio, Texas
| 1969
| Public
| 30,474
| 2012
| 2013
| C-USA
|-
| Texas State University| Bobcats
| San Marcos, Texas
| 1899
| Public
| 34,229
| 2012
| 2013
| Sun Belt
|-
| 
| Golden Hurricane
| Tulsa, Oklahoma
| 1894
| Private
| 4,352
| 1996
| 2005
| The American 
|-
| 
| Utes
| Salt Lake City, Utah
| 1850
| Public
| 32,388
| 1962
| 1999
| Pac-12
|-
| Utah State University| Aggies
| Logan, Utah
| 1888
| Public
| 28,796
| 2005
| 2013
| Mountain West
|-
| 
| Cowboys & Cowgirls
| Laramie, Wyoming
| 1866
| Public
| 12,496
| 1962
| 1999
| Mountain West
|}

Notes

Former affiliate members

Notes

Membership timeline

    

Prior to the 1996–97 season, both Air Force and Hawaii had most to all of their women's sports competing in other conferences before joining the WAC full-time with their men's sports counterparts. At that time, Air Force was in the Colorado Athletic Conference, and Hawaii was in the Big West Conference. 
Since the 2021–22 season, the WAC has played football at the FCS level.

History
Formation

The WAC formed out of a series of talks between Brigham Young University athletic director Eddie Kimball and other university administrators from 1958 to 1961 to form a new athletic conference that would better fit the needs and situations of certain universities which were at the time members of the Border, Skyline, and Pacific Coast Conferences. Potential member universities who were represented at the meetings included BYU, Washington State, Oregon, Oregon State, Utah, New Mexico, Arizona, Arizona State, and Wyoming. While the three Washington and Oregon schools elected to stay in a revamped Pac-8 Conference that replaced the scandal-plagued PCC, the remaining six schools formed the WAC.  The Border and Skyline conferences, having each lost three of their stronger members, dissolved at the end of the 1961–62 season. The charter members of the WAC were Arizona, Arizona State, BYU, New Mexico, Utah, and Wyoming. New Mexico State and Utah State applied for charter membership and were turned down; they would eventually become WAC members 43 years later.

Success and first expansion
The conference proved to be an almost perfect fit for the six schools from both a competitive and financial standpoint. Arizona and Arizona State, in particular, experienced success in baseball with Arizona garnering the 1963 College World Series (CWS) runner-up trophy and ASU winning the CWS in 1965, 1967, and 1969. Colorado State and Texas-El Paso (UTEP), at that time just renamed from Texas Western College, were accepted in September 1967 (joined in July 1968) to bring membership up 

With massive growth in the state of Arizona, the balance of WAC play in the 1970s became increasingly skewed in favor of the Arizona schools, who won or tied for all but two WAC football titles from 1969 onward. In the summer of 1978, the two schools left the WAC for the Pac-8, which became the Pac-10, and were replaced in the WAC by San Diego State and, one year later, Hawaii. The WAC further expanded by adding Air Force in the summer of 1980. A college football national championship won by Brigham Young in 1984 added to the WAC's reputation. This nine-team line-up of the WAC defined the conference for nearly 15 years.

Second wave of expansion
Fresno State expanded its athletic program in the early 1990s and was granted membership in 1992 as the nationwide trend against major college programs independent of conferences accelerated. The WAC merged with the High Country Athletic Conference, a parallel organization to the WAC for women's athletics, in 1990 to unify both men's and women's athletics under one administrative structure.

In 1996, the WAC expanded again, adding six schools to its ranks for a total of sixteen. Rice, TCU, and SMU joined the league from the Southwest Conference, which had disbanded. Big West Conference members San Jose State and UNLV were also admitted, as well as Tulsa from the Missouri Valley Conference. Also, two WAC members for men's sports at the time, Air Force and Hawaii, brought their women's sports into the WAC. With the expansion, the WAC was divided into two divisions, the Mountain and the Pacific.

To help in organizing schedules and travel for the far-flung league, the members were divided into four quadrants of four teams each, as follows:

Quadrant one was always part of the Pacific Division, and quadrant four was always part of the Mountain Division. Quadrant two was part of the Pacific Division for 1996 and 1997 before switching to the Mountain Division in 1998, while the reverse was true for quadrant three. The scheduled fourth year of the alignment was abandoned after eight schools left to form the Mountain West Conference.

The division champions in football met from 1996 to 1998 in the WAC Championship Game, held at Sam Boyd Stadium (also known as the Silver Bowl) in the Las Vegas Valley.

Turbulence at the turn of the millennium
Increasingly, most of the older, pre-1996 members—particularly Air Force, BYU, Colorado State, Utah, and Wyoming—felt chagrin at this new arrangement. With such a far-flung league, travel costs became a concern. The presidents of Air Force, BYU, Colorado State, Utah, and Wyoming met in 1998 at Denver International Airport and agreed to split off to form a new league. The breakaway group invited old-line WAC schools New Mexico and San Diego State, and newcomer UNLV to join them in the new Mountain West Conference, which began competition in 1999.

A USA Today article summed up the reasons behind the split. "With Hawaii and the Texas schools separated by about 3,900 miles and four time zones, travel costs were a tremendous burden for WAC teams. The costs, coupled with lagging revenue and a proposed realignment that would have separated rivals such as Colorado State and Air Force, created unrest among the eight defecting schools."

BYU and Utah would later leave the MWC for the West Coast Conference and Pac-12 Conference, respectively; BYU football is an FBS independent that is scheduled to join the Big 12 Conference in 2023.

WAC in the 2000s

In 2000, the University of Nevada, Reno (Nevada) of the Big West joined as part of its plan to upgrade its athletic program.

TCU left for Conference USA in 2001 (it would later leave C-USA to become the ninth member of the Mountain West in 2005, and joined the Big 12 in 2012).

The Big West announced that it would drop football after the 2000 season, but four of its football-playing members (Boise State, Idaho, New Mexico State, and Utah State) were unwilling to drop football. Boise State was invited to join the WAC and promptly departed the Big West, while New Mexico State and Idaho joined the Sun Belt Conference (NMSU as a full member, Idaho as a "football only" member) and Utah State operated as an independent D-IA program.  At the same time, Louisiana Tech (LA Tech) ended its independent Div. I-A status and also accepted an invitation to join the WAC with Boise State.

In 2005, Conference USA sought new members to replenish its ranks after losing members to the Big East, which had lost members to the ACC.  Four WAC schools, former SWC schools Rice and SMU, as well as Tulsa and UTEP, joined Conference USA. In response, the WAC added Idaho, New Mexico State, and Utah State – all former Big West schools which left the conference in 2000 along with Boise State when that conference dropped football.  The three new schools were all land grant universities, bringing the conference total to five (Nevada and Hawaii).

Membership changes and the elimination of football

The decade of the 2010s began with a series of conference realignment moves that would have trickle-down effects throughout Division I football, and profoundly change the membership of the WAC.  Boise State decided to move to the Mountain West Conference (MWC) for the 2011–12 season, and to replace departing BYU, the MWC also recruited WAC members Fresno State and Nevada for 2012–13. WAC commissioner Karl Benson courted several schools to replace those leaving, including the University of Montana, which declined, as well as the University of Denver, University of Texas at San Antonio (UTSA), and Texas State University-San Marcos, which all accepted effective 2012–13.

But the resulting eastward shift of the conference's geographic center led Hawaii to reduce travel expenses by becoming a football-only member of the MWC and joining the California-based Big West Conference for all other sports. Further invitations were then issued by the WAC to Seattle University and the University of Texas at Arlington. These changes meant that the conference would have 10 members for 2012–13, seven of which sponsored football, and Benson announced that the WAC planned to add two additional football-playing members to begin competition in 2013. A further boost came when Boise State decided to join the Big East in football, and return to the WAC in most other sports, as of the 2013–14 academic year. So by the end of 2011, the WAC seemed to have weathered the latest round of conference changes, and once again reinvented itself for the future.

But from this seemingly strong position, early 2012 brought forth a series of moves that shook the conference to its very core, beginning with Utah State and San Jose State accepting offers to join the MWC. Four similar announcements followed with UTSA and Louisiana Tech jumping to Conference USA, plus Texas State and UT Arlington heading to the Sun Belt Conference, all as of 2013–14. Boise State also canceled plans to rejoin the WAC, instead opting to place its non-football sports in the Big West Conference, before eventually deciding to simply remain in the MWC. These changes left the WAC's viability as a Division I football conference in grave doubt.  The two remaining football-playing members, New Mexico State and Idaho, began making plans to compete in future seasons as FBS Independents; they ultimately spent only the 2013 season as independents, rejoining their one-time football home of the Sun Belt as football-only members in 2014.

In order to rebuild, as well as forestall further defections, the conference was forced to add two schools—Utah Valley University and CSU Bakersfield—which were invited in October 2012 to join the WAC in 2013–14, but this did not prevent two more members from leaving. Denver decided to take most of its athletic teams to The Summit League as of the 2013–14 season, shortly after Idaho opted to return all of its non-football sports to the Big Sky Conference in 2014–15. The conference responded over the next two months by adding Grand Canyon University, Chicago State University, and the University of Texas-Pan American. Then, in February 2013, the WAC announced the University of Missouri–Kansas City would join in the summer of 2013 as well. These changes would put the conference's membership at eight members by 2014 with only one, New Mexico State, having been in the WAC just three years earlier. Due to losing the majority of its football-playing members, the WAC would stop sponsoring the sport after the 2012–13 season, thereby becoming a non-football conference.

In 2013, the University of Texas System announced that Texas–Pan American would merge with the University of Texas at Brownsville; the new institution, the University of Texas Rio Grande Valley (UTRGV), began operation for the 2015–16 school year. UTRGV inherited UTPA's athletic program and WAC membership.

In January 2017, California Baptist University announced it would transition from NCAA Division II and join the WAC in 2018.

In November 2017, Cal State Bakersfield announced it would accept an invitation to the Big West and join its new conference in 2020.

In January 2019, Dixie State University, now known as Utah Tech University, announced it would move its athletics to Division I and join the WAC in 2020.

In June 2019, the University of Missouri–Kansas City announced it would leave the WAC to join the Summit League in 2020; this announcement came shortly before the rebranding of its athletic program as the Kansas City Roos.

In September 2019, Tarleton State University of Division II announced that it would move to Division I and join the WAC in 2020.

2021–2023 membership changes and reinstatement of football

On January 14, 2021, the Western Athletic Conference announced its intention to reinstate football as a conference-sponsored sport at the FCS level, as well as the addition of five new members to the conference in all sports, including football, at a press conference held at the NRG Center in Houston, Texas. The new members announced included four Southland Conference members from Texas in Abilene Christian University, Lamar University, Sam Houston State University, and Stephen F. Austin State University, which would soon be dubbed the "Texas Four", plus Southern Utah University from the Big Sky Conference. The conference also announced that it would most likely add another member that fielded a football team at a later date. While the WAC originally announced that all new members would join on July 1, 2022, commissioner Jeff Hurd later said that the arrival of the Texas Four "was expedited" to July 1, 2021. The conference officially confirmed this on January 21, 2021, adding that the relaunch of football was moved forward to fall 2021. The conference also confirmed media reports that the Southland had expelled the Texas Four after they announced their departure. Southern Utah entered as scheduled in 2022.

During the aforementioned press conference, Hurd also announced that the WAC would split into two divisions for all sports except football and men's and women's basketball. One division will consist of the six Texas schools (the Texas Four plus existing members Tarleton and UTRGV).

Also on January 14, 2021, news broke that UTRGV, a non-football playing member of the conference, had committed to create an FCS football program by 2024. In addition, UTRGV will also launch women's swimming and diving for the same year. The launch of football was later put off to 2025; it has since been confirmed that UTRGV football will become part of the new ASUN–WAC Football Conference (see below).

The WAC's planned reestablishment of a football conference at the FCS level has also been accompanied by speculation that the conference intends to eventually move its football league back up to FBS in the future, possibly by 2030. Later that same month, the WAC moved the start of their FCS sponsorship of football to Fall 2021, with media reports indicating that the University of Central Arkansas, Eastern Kentucky University, and Jacksonville State University would be added as football affiliates for 2021. The three schools were set to join the ASUN Conference in July 2021; that league plans to add FCS football, but not until at least 2022. The entry of the three incoming ASUN members into the new football league was officially confirmed at a February 23, 2021, ASUN press conference. These schools joined the Texas Four in a round-robin schedule officially branded interchangeably as the "ASUN–WAC Challenge" and "WAC–ASUN Challenge"; the two conferences proposed an amendment to NCAA bylaws that would allow their partnership (and presumably any others of its kind) to receive an immediate FCS playoff berth. Utah Tech (formerly Dixie State) and Tarleton are included in alliance members' schedules, but are not eligible for the FCS playoffs until completing their Division I transitions in 2024; at least for 2021, games involving those two schools do not count in alliance standings, although both are included in the separate WAC league table.

On the same day as the WAC's initial announcement, Chicago State University announced it would leave the WAC in June 2022. Chicago State was originally added in 2013 along with the University of Missouri–Kansas City, originally with an intention for both institutions to serve as anchors for a midwestern-centered division for the conference. No other universities in the region were added to the WAC, and UMKC (now known for athletic purposes as Kansas City) departed the conference in 2020 for its former home of the Summit League. This left Chicago State, which does not sponsor football, as the only WAC member east of Texas. Chicago State's departure rendered Seattle University as the only WAC member institution not geographically located in the southwestern United States.

On November 5, 2021, it was reported that New Mexico State and Sam Houston would be leaving the WAC for Conference USA in 2023. The WAC responded by adding Incarnate Word from the Southland Conference and UT Arlington from the Sun Belt Conference; however, UIW later reversed course and decided to stay with the SLC only days before the 2022-23 athletic season officially began. Lamar also announced that it too would return to its former home of the Southland Conference in 2023 roughly three months prior to UIW's announcement, on April 8, 2022; however, three months later, it was announced that the SLC and Lamar would be accelerating the rejoining process so that Lamar could return for the 2022 athletic season instead.

Jacksonville State and Sam Houston both started FBS transitions in the 2022 season, rendering both ineligible for the FCS playoffs and also dropping both the ASUN and WAC to 5 playoff-eligible football members, one short of the 6 required for an automatic playoff berth. This led the WAC and ASUN to renew their football partnership for the 2022 season. Both conferences would hold their own 2022 football seasons; on June 10, 2022, the WAC announced that the two leagues would determine the alliance's automatic qualifier by a process that was not announced at that time.

ESPN reported on December 9, 2022, that the WAC and ASUN had agreed to form a new football-only conference that planned to start play in 2024. The initial membership would consist of Abilene Christian, Southern Utah, Stephen F. Austin, Tarleton, and Utah Tech from the WAC, plus Austin Peay, Central Arkansas, Eastern Kentucky, and North Alabama from the ASUN. UTRGV would become the 10th member upon its planned addition of football in 2025. The new football conference also reportedly plans to move "from what is currently known as FCS football to what is currently known as FBS football at the earliest practicable date." On December 20, the two conferences jointly announced that they would fully merge their football leagues effective in 2023 under the tentative name of "ASUN–WAC Football Conference". The initial membership will be the aforementioned nine programs, with UTRGV becoming the tenth in 2025. The new football league will play a six-game schedule in 2023 before starting full round-robin conference play in 2024. Neither conference's announcement mentioned any plans to move to FBS.

Commissioners

Sports
The Western Athletic Conference currently sponsors championship competition in 10 men's and 10 women's NCAA-sanctioned sports, with football as the newest addition in fall 2021, initially as the ASUN–WAC (or WAC–ASUN) Challenge. In addition to the three ASUN members that are de facto football associates, 10 other schools are currently associate members in four sports.

Men's sponsored sports by school
Departing members in red.

Men's varsity sports not sponsored by the Western Athletic Conference which are played by WAC schools
Future members in gray.

Women's sponsored sports by school
Departing members in red.

Women's varsity sports not sponsored by the Western Athletic Conference which are played by WAC schools

Departing members in red.

In addition to the above:
 California Baptist considers its team in the all-female cheerleading discipline of STUNT to be a varsity team. (However, it does not classify its official cheerleaders as such, listing its cheerleading squad and dance team separately as "spirit squads" on its athletic website.) The STUNT team competes in the non-NCAA sport as an independent member of the College STUNT Association.

Football

The WAC sponsored football from its founding in 1962 through the 2012 season. However, the defection of all but two football-playing schools to other conferences caused the conference to drop sponsorship after fifty-one years.

Reinstatement
On January 14, 2021, the WAC announced its intention to reinstate football as a conference-sponsored sport at the FCS level, as well as the addition of five new members to the conference in all sports, including football. The new members announced include the "Texas Four" of Abilene Christian University, Lamar University, Sam Houston State University, and Stephen F. Austin State University, then members of the Southland Conference, along with Southern Utah University, currently of the Big Sky Conference. Originally, all schools were planned to join in July 2022, but the entry of the Texas Four was moved to July 2021 after the Southland expelled its departing members. The WAC also announced that it would most likely add another football-playing institution at a later date.

On the same day, news broke that the University of Texas Rio Grande Valley, a non-football playing WAC member, had committed to create an FCS football program by 2024. The program will most likely compete as part of the newly-reinstated WAC football conference.

The WAC ultimately partnered with the ASUN Conference to reestablish its football league, with the Texas Four being joined by three incoming ASUN members for at least the fall 2021 season in what it calls the ASUN–WAC (or WAC–ASUN) Challenge. The Challenge was abbreviated as "AQ7", as the top finisher of the seven teams would be an automatic qualifier for the FCS postseason. The two conferences renewed their alliance for the 2022 season, although both leagues will conduct separate conference seasons and then choose the alliance's automatic qualifier by an as-yet-undetermined process. Both the WAC and ASUN initially planned to have 6 playoff-eligible teams in 2022, but each lost such a member with the start of FBS transitions by Jacksonville State and Sam Houston.

The WAC has been speculated to move back up to FBS in the future following the reestablishment of the football conference at the FCS level.

Men's basketballWAC tournamentRivalriesMen's basketball rivalries involving WAC teams include:AwardsWomen's basketballWAC tournamentRivalriesWomen's basketball rivalries involving WAC teams include:

Baseball
The WAC has claimed seven NCAA baseball national championships. The most recent WAC national champion is the 2008 Fresno State Bulldogs baseball team.WAC tournamentChampionships
Current champions
Source:
 For the sports in which the WAC recognizes both regular-season and tournament champions:
 (RS) indicates regular-season champion.
 (T) indicates tournament champion.
 For other sports, only a tournament champion is recognized.
 Champions from a previous school year are indicated with the calendar year of their title.

National championships
The following teams have won NCAA national championships while being a member of the WAC:

Arizona – baseball (1976)
Arizona State – baseball (1965, 1967, 1969, 1977)
BYU – men's track & field (shared the national title in 1970)
BYU – men's golf (1981)
BYU – women's cross country (1997)
Fresno State – softball (1998)
Fresno State – baseball (2008)
Rice – baseball (2003)
UTEP – NCAA Division I Men's Cross Country (1969, 1975, 1976, 1978, 1979, 1981)
UTEP – NCAA Division I Men's Indoor Track and Field (1974,1975,1976,1978,1980,1981,1982)
UTEP – NCAA Division I Men's Outdoor Track and Field (1975, 1978, 1979, 1980, 1981, 1982)
UNLV – men's golf (1998)

The WAC has also produced one AP national champion in football:

BYU (1984)

The following teams won AIAW (and forerunner DGWS) women's national championships while their universities were members of the WAC:

Arizona State (15) – swimming (8), badminton (4), softball (2), golf (1)
Utah (3) – cross country (Div. II), gymnastics, skiing
UTEP (1) – indoor track and field

Spending and revenue

Total revenue includes ticket sales, contributions and donations, rights/licensing, student fees, school funds and all other sources including TV income, camp income, food and novelties. Total expenses includes coaching/staff, scholarships, buildings/ground, maintenance, utilities and rental fees and all other costs including recruiting, team travel, equipment and uniforms, conference dues and insurance costs.

Facilities
Departing members highlighted in red; future members in gray.

AwardsCommissioner's CupThe WAC awards its Commissioner's Cup to the school that performs the best in each of the conference's 19 men's and women's championships.Joe Kearney AwardNamed in honor of former WAC commissioner Dr. Joseph Kearney, the awards are given annually to the top male and female WAC athlete. The various WAC member institutions Athletics Directors select the male award winner, while the WAC member institutions Senior Women's Administrators choose the female honoree.Stan Bates Award'''

The award is named in honor of former WAC Commissioner Stan Bates and honors the WAC's top male and female scholar-athletes, recognizing the recipients’ athletic and academic accomplishments. In addition, the awards carry a $3,000 postgraduate scholarship.

Media

WAC Digital Network
In 2014–15, the WAC initiated a new digital network to give fans high quality streaming internet access to many of its regular season games and postseason championships including volleyball, soccer, swimming and diving, basketball, softball and baseball.

References

External links

 

 
Articles which contain graphical timelines